Giuseppe Arezzi (Pontecurone 1 March 1917 – Pavia 17 June 1990), was an Italian footballer.

Club career 
He begins in the Vogherese. In 1938 it passes to the Forlimpopoli and then to the Forlì. Between 1940 and 1941 he plays for Venice and Pavia.

From 1941 until 1952 it plays for Padova, Modena, Varese, Pavia, Alessandria and Inter. With the Inter he plays only one season totalling 26 presences and one goal. In career he wins two championships of Series B, respectively with Modena and Alessandria.

External links

 
 

1917 births
Year of death missing
Italian footballers
Association football midfielders
Serie A players
A.S.D. AVC Vogherese 1919 players
F.C. Pavia players
Calcio Padova players
Modena F.C. players
S.S.D. Varese Calcio players
U.S. Alessandria Calcio 1912 players
Inter Milan players